Dora Lane (born 13 January 1976) is a former professional tennis player from Bulgaria. She competed as Dora Djilianova.

Biography
Originally from Plovdiv, Lane competed on the ITF Circuit during the 1990s, reaching a best ranking of 327 in the world. Most notably she represented the Bulgaria Fed Cup team in a 1995 World Group Play-off against South Africa in Bloemfontein. She played in the doubles rubber, which she and partner Lubomira Bacheva lost to Amanda Coetzer and Elna Reinach.

Lane left the professional tennis circuit in 1996 to take up a scholarship to California State University, Fresno. As a senior, she was ranked as high as fourth in the country. She is now based in Reno, Nevada and works as an employment attorney.

ITF Circuit finals

Singles: 3 (1 title, 2 runner–ups)

Doubles: 5 (2 titles, 3 runner–ups)

References

External links
 
 
 

1976 births
Living people
Bulgarian female tennis players
Fresno State Bulldogs women's tennis players
Bulgarian emigrants to the United States
Sportspeople from Plovdiv
College women's tennis players in the United States